Ephraim McDowell Regional Medical Center (EMRMC) is a locally controlled not-for-profit 222-bed hospital located in Danville, Kentucky.

History

EMRMC took its name from Ephraim McDowell, a ground-breaking local physician who performed the first ovariotomy in the United States in 1809.

Following Dr. McDowell's successful surgery, Danville became home to a number of physicians. This led to the formation of a community hospital in 1887. Through the years, the hospital expanded often. It marked its centennial in 1987 by changing its name to Ephraim McDowell Regional Medical Center.

Today

EMRMC's primary service area includes Boyle County, Kentucky and five contiguous counties -- Casey, Garrard, Lincoln, Mercer, and Washington—with a total population of more than 140,000 residents.

According to its IRS Form 990, in Fiscal Year 2007 EMRMC had assets of $110,438,710, income of $105,401,634, and revenue of $105,286,175.

Thomson Reuters named EMRMC among its top 100 Performance Improvement Leaders. About 3,000 hospitals across the country were evaluated on analysis of data provided from public sources such as Medicaid and Medicare from a five-year period between 2001 and 2005.

Services

Available services include:

 Behavioral Health Services
 Cancer Care Center
 Cancer Care-Central Kentucky Cancer Program (CKCP)
 Cardiac Care Services
 Critical Care
 Diabetes and Endocrinology Center
 Diagnostic Services
 Emergency Care
 Kids Can Do Pediatric Therapy Center
 Laboratory Services
 Medical/Surgical Services
 Nearly 100 Physicians Offering 29 Specialties
 Orthopedic Care
 Pastoral Care
 Pain Management Center
 Rehabilitation Services
 Respiratory Therapy
 Skilled Nursing Care Unit
 Sleep Disorders Center
 Surgical Services
 Vascular Services
 Volunteer Opportunities/Auxiliary
 Women's Health Services
 Wound Healing Center

Accreditations

The following aspects of EMRMC have been accredited by recognized authorities:

 EMRMC -- Joint Commission on Accreditation of Healthcare Organizations (JCAHO).
 Cardiovascular Laboratory -- Intersocietal Commission for the Accreditation of Vascular Laboratories (ICAVL).
 Clinical Laboratory Services -- College of American Pathologists.
 Diabetes Management -- American Diabetes Association.
 Extracranial Cerebrovascular Testing—Intersocietal Commission for the Accreditation of Vascular Laboratories.
 Mobile Mammography Unit -- American College of Radiology and U.S. Food and Drug Administration under the Mammography Quality Standards Act.
 Pain Management Center—American Academy of Pain Management.
 Peripheral Arterial Testing—Intersocietal Commission for the Accreditation of Vascular Laboratories.
 Peripheral Venous Testing—Intersocietal Commission for the Accreditation of Vascular Laboratories.
 Sleep Disorders Center -- American Academy of Sleep Medicine.

Partner organizations

Either directly or through its parent organization, Ephraim McDowell Health, EMRMC is related to the following:

 Air Evac Lifeteam, an air-medical service operates from Stuart Powell Field in Danville.
 Central Kentucky Surgery Center provides outpatient surgery.
 Family Medical Centers comprise six health care facilities in Boyle and five other counties that offer family medical care and diagnostic services.
 Fort Logan Hospital is a 25-bed critical access hospital located in Stanford, Kentucky.
 McDowell Place is an independent and assisted living community in Danville.
 McDowell Wellness Center provides machines and swimming facilities to enhance fitness.
 MedSource provides home medical equipment and medical supplies for home use.
 Spine Center of Central Kentucky provides care and treatment of spine diseases and disorders.

References

External links
 Ephraim McDowell Regional Medical Center

Hospital buildings completed in 1887
Buildings and structures in Danville, Kentucky
Hospitals in Kentucky
Trauma centers